Benoît Chomel de Jarnieu (born 6 October 1955 in Saint-Mandé) is a French admiral, currently major général of the Navy (n°2 of the Navy).

References 
 Amiral Benoît Chomel de Jarnieu, French Ministry of Defence.

External links 

Living people
French Navy admirals
1955 births
Officiers of the Légion d'honneur